Blackball, black-ball, black ball, blackballed, or blackballing may refer to:
 Blackballing,  a rejection in a traditional form of secret ballot

Film
 Blackball (film), a 2003 film starring Paul Kaye
 Blackballed: The Bobby Dukes Story, a 2004 film starring Rob Corddry

Games
 Blackball, a monster in the Mystara campaign setting of Advanced Dungeons & Dragons

Music
 "Blackball" (The Offspring song), 1989
 "Blackball", a song by the industrial band KMFDM, on their 2003 album WWIII
 "Blackball", the second song on the 2008 Bigelf album Cheat the Gallows

Sports
 The  in pocket billiards games including pool and snooker
 Blackball (pool), a variant of the pocket billiards game eight-ball
 Blackball, alternate name for Negro league baseball
 Blackball (surfing), a flag to show surfers that they must clear the water

Other
 Blackball, New Zealand, a small town located on the western coast of the South Island of New Zealand
 Blackball Branch a branch railway line to Blackball, New Zealand
 The Black Ball, an annual fundraising dance for the Keep a Child Alive charity
 "Black ball", alternative name for Shade ball
 Black Ball: a round black shape hoisted at a ship's mast head, with various contextual meanings.
 "Blackballing", a form of male hazing ritual in which the victim's genitals are covered in black shoe polish. Common in British boarding schools and fraternities.

See also
 Blackballed (disambiguation)
 Blacklisting, listing people, countries or other entities to be avoided or distrusted 
 Black Ball Line (disambiguation), several shipping companies